Chilo tamsi is a moth in the family Crambidae. It was described by A. P. Kapur in 1950. It is found in India.

References

Chiloini
Moths described in 1950